Bodega Aurrerá is a Mexican discount store owned by Walmart de México y Centroamérica. The chain was first established in 1970 in Mexico City. Though every Aurrerá store was converted into Walmart, both Aurrerá and Bodega Aurrerá names survived, the former as a product brand and the latter as a store.

History 

In Mexico, the Arango brothers, Jerónimo, Placido and Manuel, founded the stores Aurrerá thinking in a supermarket model, with household items and clothing at cheaper prices. Aurrera in Basque means “Come on”, “Forward” .

 1958: Opens the first Aurrerá store, with the Bolívar location.
 1960: Begins to operate the store brand of Superama.
 1964: Starts the operation of Vips Restaurants.
 1970: Begins the operations of the Suburbia and Bodega Aurrerá store brands.
 1976: Inaugurates the first Distribution Center in Mexico (in Spanish, CEDIS).
 1978: Opening of the restaurant chain El Portón (The Gate).
 1986: Creates the organization Grupo Cifra, for the administration of stores and restaurants in Mexico.
 1990: Aurrerá starts the usage of the barcode system in Mexico.
 1991: Walmart and Cifra create a joint venture, the International Division of Walmart Stores, and Walmart signs a partnership agreement with Cifra. The first Sam's Club store in Mexico opens.
 1993: They begin operations as Walmart Supercenter stores. The Aurrerá supermarkets change their style and design, as Walmart stores.
 1994: The brands of Suburbia and Vips are joined, under the association Cifra/Walmart Distribuidora, S.A. de C.V.
 1997: Walmart buys most of the shares, and acquires control of the company.
 2000: Grupo Cifra is renamed as Walmart de Mexico.
 2001: Aurrerá stores become Walmart Supercenters and Warehouse Aurrerá.
 2005: Walmart Mexico creates the store brand Mi Bodega Aurrerá, which currently has over 50 units in various parts of the Mexican Republic. It is a variant of Bodega Aurrerá, with less store area and fewer products.
 2007: Bodega Aurrerá has about 300 locations, driving retail prices lower for much of the Mexican Republic.
 2012: Bodega Aurrerá has 372 stores.

See also

 Aurrerá (Bodega Aurrerá's prior parent company)
 Walmart de México y Centroamérica, the subsidiary supermarket division, which operates Bodega Aurrerá in Mexico.

References

External links
 

Retail companies established in 1970
Supermarkets of Mexico
Mexican companies established in 1970
Walmart